Samuel Duane Cooper (born June 25, 1969) is an American former professional basketball player.

College career
Born in Benton Harbor, Michigan, Cooper graduated from the University of Southern California.

Pro career
Cooper was selected by the Los Angeles Lakers in the 2nd round (36th overall) of the 1992 NBA draft. A 6'1" guard, Cooper played two years in the NBA for the Lakers and Phoenix Suns. In his NBA career, Cooper appeared in a total of 88 games and averaged 2.3 ppg. He also played in pre-season games (but not in any regular season games) for Charlotte Hornets (1995) and Toronto Raptors (1996).

External links
Bio

1969 births
Living people
African-American basketball players
American expatriate basketball people in France
American expatriate basketball people in Greece
American expatriate basketball people in Poland
American men's basketball players
Asseco Gdynia players
Basketball players from Michigan
Fort Wayne Fury players
Harlem Globetrotters players
Los Angeles Lakers draft picks
Los Angeles Lakers players
Oklahoma City Cavalry players
Omaha Racers players
People from Benton Harbor, Michigan
People from Lakewood, California
Phoenix Suns players
Point guards
Sportspeople from Los Angeles County, California
USC Trojans men's basketball players
Yakima Sun Kings players
21st-century African-American people
20th-century African-American sportspeople